Agrilactobacillus composti is a bacterium from the genus of Agrilactobacillus which has been isolated from compost in Japan.

References

Lactobacillaceae
Bacteria described in 2007